South San Antonio Independent School District (South San ISD, SSAISD) is a public school district based in San Antonio, Texas (USA). The district serves southern and southwestern portions of the city. For the school year (2015-2016) the district served 9,960 students in 16 schools. This district was the 107th-largest by enrollment in the state of Texas.

History

From 2013 to 2018, total SSAISD enrollment declined by 1,400. The enrollment from the 2013-2014 school year until August 2019 decreased by 12%. From the beginning to the end of the 2017-2018 school year, the enrollment declined by over 550 students. From October 2018 until the end of the 2018-2019 school year the enrollment declined from 8,900 to 8,630.

In 2019, the board chose to re-open West Campus High, Kazen Middle, and Athens elementary, even though the superintendent and a large minority on the board opposed the matters. The enrollments did not reach the district's projections. More than $2.7 million, including $340,000 in cleaning costs, was spent on renovations of the three campuses.

Superintendent 
From 2014 the superintendent of South San Antonio Independent School District was Abelardo Saavedra, who was appointed to the position in March 2014. He resigned from SSAISD, with his last day being Friday October 12, 2018. Saavedra's decision to resign, as well as the district's agreement on Saavedra leaving, was approved by the SSAISD board on a 6-1 basis that day. The then-Palacios Independent School District (PISD) superintendent, Alexandro Flores, replaced him.

Krista Torralva stated that, after a change in the composition of the school board, the new leading bloc of board members did not support Flores. In September 2019 Flores, along with three board members, resigned. Chief academic officer Dolores Sendejo became the interim superintendent.

Schools
High schools (Grades 9-12)
South San Antonio High School - Mascot: Bobcat, Colors: Blue and White, 1947–Present
 West Campus High School - Mascot: Cougar, Colors: Red and Blue 1976-2007 and 2019- (later served as administrative offices)
 The campus flooded in 2007, and SSAISD at the time did not return students to the campus but instead made it into administrative space. It was one of three schools re-opened in 2019, in this case with 9th grade students. As of August 28, 2019 it had 57 students. The administrative offices were moved to the former Olivares Elementary School. Each year the school is supposed to add a grade level.

Middle schools (Grades 6-8)
Dwight Middle - Mascot: Bocat, Colors: Blue and White
Abraham Kazen Middle School Mascot: Panthers, Colors: Black and Gold
It was one of two schools closed by the district in 2017 to reduce expenses, and one of three schools re-opened in 2019. As of August 28, 2019 it had 183 students.
Alan B. Shepard Middle - Mascot: Cougar, Colors: Red, White, and Blue
Robert C. Zamora Middle - Mascot: Jaguar, Colors: Baby Blue and Navy Blue

Elementary schools (Grades PK-5)
Athens Elementary - Mascot: Cowboy, Colors: Blue and White
It was one of two schools closed by the district in 2017 to reduce expenses, one of three schools re-opened in 2019. As of August 28, 2019 it had 202 students. In 2019 it was the first campus deemed by SSAISD as a "community school".
Neil Armstrong Elementary - Mascot: Astro, Colors: Red, White and Blue
Roy P. Benavidez Elementary - Mascot: Patriot, Colors: Red, White and Blue
Miguel Carrillo Jr. Elementary - Mascot: Wildcat, Colors: Maroon and White
Five Palms Elementary - Mascot: Eagle, Colors: Blue and White
Hutchins Elementary - Mascot: Viking, Colors: Purple and White
Kindred Elementary - Mascot: Tiger, Colors: Red, White and Blue
Frank Madla Elementary (Formally Royalgate - 19##-2006) - Mascot: Alligator, Colors: Red and White
Palo Alto Elementary - Mascot: Ram, Colors: Red and Blue
Price Elementary - Mascot: Cobra, Colors: Blue and Yellow

Former schools
Olivares Elementary School - For a period it housed offices of the Bexar County Sheriff's Offices, which leased the facility. In 2019 administrative offices formerly at West Campus and the Disciplinary Alternative Education Program (DAEP) were moved to the Olivares building.

Distinctions 
South San Antonio ISD received a “No Improvement Required” status for the 2016 school year, and none of its schools received failing ratings. This was the second year in a row for the district. That same year, the district's STAAR results produced a total of 21 TEA distinctions that were awarded to 10 SSAISD campuses. This equates to two-thirds of the District’s campuses earning at least one distinction, and made it the fourth highest percentage total for all Bexar County's independent school districts.

School board 

South San Antonio Independent School District is overseen by a seven-member board. They serve four-year terms by specific geographic district without compensation.

School board elections 
Members of the South San Antonio Board of Trustees are elected to four-year terms. Four seats were up for election on November 4, 2014. The District 7 election was for an unexpired two-year term. Four seats were up for election on November 8, 2016.

References

External links

School districts in Bexar County, Texas
School districts in San Antonio